Sekhemkhet (also read as Sechemchet) was an ancient Egyptian king (pharaoh) of the 3rd Dynasty during the Old Kingdom. His reign is thought to have been from about 2648 BC until 2640 BC. He is also known under his later traditioned birth name Djoser-tety and under his Hellenized name Tyreis (by Manetho; derived from Teti in the Abydos King List). Sekhemkhet was probably the brother or eldest son of king Djoser. Little is known about this king, since he ruled for only a few years. However, he erected a step pyramid at Saqqara and left behind a well known rock inscription at Wadi Maghareh (Sinai Peninsula).

Reign 

The duration of Sekhemkhet's reign is believed to have been six to seven years. The royal Turin Canon attributes six years of reign to Sekhemkhet, a figure also proposed by Myriam Wissa based on the unfinished state of Sekhemkhet's pyramid. Using his reconstruction of the Palermo Stone (5th Dynasty), Toby Wilkinson assigns seven years to this king. Similarly, the historian Manetho lists Sekhemkhet under the name of Tyreis and indicates that he reigned for seven years. Nabil Swelim, by contrast, proposed a reign of nineteen years, because he believed that Sekhemkhet might be the Tosertasis mentioned by Manetho. However, such a long reign is at odds with the unfinished state of the buried pyramid and this view is generally rejected by Egyptologists.

Little is known about activities conducted during Sekhemkhet's reign. The only preserved documents showing Sekhemkhet are two rock inscriptions at Wadi Maghareh in the Sinai peninsula. The first one shows Sekhemkhet twice: once wearing the Hedjet crown, another wearing the Deshret crown. The second inscription depicts a scene known as "smiting the enemy": Sekhemkhet has grabbed a foe by its hair and raises his arm in an attempt to club the enemy to death with a ceremonial sceptre. The presence of these reliefs at Wadi Maghareh suggests that local mines of copper and turquoise were exploited during Sekhemkhet's reign. These mines were apparently active throughout the early 3rd Dynasty since reliefs of Djoser and Sanakht were also discovered in the Wadi Maghareh.

Several clay seals presenting an unusual Nebty name together with Sekhemkhet's Horus name were found at the eastern excavation site on the island of Elephantine. The Egyptologist Jean Pierre Pätznik reads the Nebty name as Ren nebty meaning The two ladies are pleased with his name. It is not entirely clear whether this is indeed Sekhemkhet's nebty name or that of a yet unknown queen.

Family 
Sekhemkhet's wife may have been Djeseretnebti, but this name appears without any queen's title, and Egyptologists dispute the true meaning and reading of this name. The name has alternatively been read as Djeser-Ti and identified with the cartouche-name Djeser-Teti presented in the Saqqara King List as the direct successor of Djoser. Sekhemkhet surely had sons and daughters, but up to this date no personal name was found.

Some consider Sekhemkhet to be the brother of Djoser, making him another son of Khasekhemwy, who was the final king of the Second Dynasty. If this is true, his mother would be Nimaathap.

Tomb 

Sekhemkhet's pyramid is sometimes referred to as the "Buried Pyramid" and was first excavated in 1952 by Egyptian archaeologist Zakaria Goneim. A sealed sarcophagus was discovered beneath the pyramid, but when opened was found to be empty.

The pyramid 
Sekhemkhet's pyramid was planned as a step pyramid from the first. Its base was a square measuring 378 ft x 378 ft (220 x 220 cubits). If the pyramid had been completed, it would have had six or seven steps and a final height of 240.5 ft (140 cubits). These proportions would have given the pyramid an angle of elevation of 51˚50', identical to the pyramid at Meidum and the Great Pyramid of Giza. Like Djoser's pyramid, Sekhemkhet's was built of limestone blocks. The monument was not finished, possibly because of the pharaoh's sudden death. Only the first step of the pyramid was completed, leaving a monument in the shape of a large square mastaba.

Subterranean structure 
The entrance to Sekhemkhet's burial lies on the northern side of the pyramid. An open passage leads down for 200 ft. Halfway down the track a vertical shaft meets the passage from above. It opens on the surface and its entrance would lie at the second step of the pyramid, if the monument had been completed.

At the meeting spot of the passage and shaft another passageway leads down to a subterranean, U-shaped gallery containing at least 120 magazines. The whole gallery complex has the appearance of a giant comb. Shortly before the burial chamber is reached the main passage splits into two further magazine galleries, surrounding the burial chamber like a "U" (similar to the big northern gallery), but they were never finished.

The burial chamber has a base measurement of 29 ft x 17 ft and a height of 15 ft. It was also left unfinished, but surprisingly a nearly completely arranged burial was found. The sarcophagus in the midst of the chamber is made of polished alabaster and shows an unusual feature: its opening lies on the front side and is sealed by a sliding door, which was still plastered with mortar when the sarcophagus was found. The sarcophagus was empty, however and it remains unclear whether the site was ransacked after burial or whether King Sekhemkhet was buried elsewhere.

A shell shaped container made of gold was found by an Egyptian Antiquities Service excavation team in 1950. The object has a length of 1.4 in and is currently on display in Room 4 of the Egyptian Museum in Cairo.

Necropolis complex 
Because the necropolis of Sekhemkhet was never finished, it is hard to say which planned cultic building had already existed. The pyramid courtyard was surrounded by a niched enclosure wall facing north-west. It was 1.850 ft long, 607 ft wide and 33 ft high. The only archaeologically preserved cultic building is the Southern Tomb, its base measurement is estimated to be 105 ft x 52 ft. The subterranean structure included a tight corridor, beginning on the western side of the tomb and ending in a double chamber. In this chamber in 1963 Jean-Philippe Lauer excavated the burial of a two-year-old toddler. The identity of this child remains a mystery. The only fact known for certain about it is that it cannot be king Sekhemkhet himself, since the king was always depicted as a young man.

No further cultic buildings were detected, but Egyptologists and archaeologists are convinced that once upon a time a mortuary temple and a serdab existed but were destroyed due to the looting of stone from his cult buildings in antiquity.

See also 
 List of Egyptian pyramids
 List of megalithic sites

References

Bibliography 
 Hawass, Zahi. "Excavating the Old Kingdom". in Egyptian Art in the Age of the Pyramids, The Metropolitan Museum of Art. 1999.
 Leclant, Jean. "A Brief History of the Old Kingdom". in Egyptian Art in the Age of the Pyramids, The Metropolitan Museum of Art. 1999.
 Wilkinson, Toby. Royal Annals of Ancient Egypt: The Palermo Stone and Its Associated Fragments, Kegan Paul International, 2000.

External links 
 

27th-century BC Pharaohs
Pharaohs of the Third Dynasty of Egypt